Viktor Svedberg (born May 24, 1991) is a Swedish-Kazakhstani professional ice hockey defenceman who is currently under contract with Avangard Omsk of the  Kontinental Hockey League (KHL).

Svedberg was signed by the Chicago Blackhawks of the National Hockey League (NHL) in October 2013, where he spent five seasons.

Playing career
After spending seasons with Rögle BK of J18, Svedberg joined Frölunda HC. He made his Elitserien debut during the 2010-11 season. Svedberg remained with the club through the 2012–13 season.

On 16 May 2013, Svedberg signed with the Rockford IceHogs of the American Hockey League (AHL). After just four games with the club during the 2013–14 season, Svedberg was signed by the IceHogs' National Hockey League (NHL) affiliate, the Chicago Blackhawks to a two-year contract on 19 October 2013. Svedberg spent the remainder of the season, as well as the entirety of the 2014-15 season with the IceHogs.

On 5 August 2015, the Blackhawks re-signed Svedberg to a one-year contract extension. While spending majority of the 2015–16 season with the IceHogs, Svedberg appeared in 27 games for the Blackhawks. On 15 October, in just his fourth career game, Svedberg scored his first career NHL goal in a 4-1 loss to the Washington Capitals. Svedberg finished the season with four points in 27 games. On 14 March 2016, the Blackhawks signed Svedberg to a two-year contract extension.

After leaving the Blackhawks' organization following the 2017–18 season, Svedberg signed a professional tryout agreement to attend the Calgary Flames' training camp on 7 September 2018. He briefly returned to his native Sweden playing 7 games in the SHL with Linköpings HC before on December 2, 2018, Svedberg signed a contract with Barys Astana in the KHL.

After three seasons with Barys and accepting Kazakhstani citizenship, Svedberg left as a free agent and secured a three-year contract with Russian club, HC CSKA Moscow, on 7 June 2021.

Career statistics

Regular season and playoffs

International

References

External links

1991 births
Living people
Avangard Omsk players
Barys Nur-Sultan players
Chicago Blackhawks players
HC CSKA Moscow players
Frölunda HC players
Linköping HC players
Rockford IceHogs (AHL) players
Rögle BK players
Undrafted National Hockey League players
Swedish ice hockey defencemen
Kazakhstani ice hockey defencemen
Ice hockey people from Gothenburg
Naturalised citizens of Kazakhstan